Sagra Sundarpur is one of the villages in Lakshamanpur Mandal, Pratapgarh District, Uttar Pradesh State.

Villages in Pratapgarh district, Uttar Pradesh